Dave Maurer may refer to:

 Dave Maurer (American football) (1932–2011), American football player and coach
 Dave Maurer (baseball) (born 1975), Major League Baseball pitcher

See also
 David Maurer (disambiguation)